Jaqueline Góes de Jesus (born 1990) is a Brazilian scientist and researcher. She was part of the team which sequenced the Zika virus. During the COVID-19 pandemic, she was a member of the team responsible for sequencing the first genome of the SARS-CoV-2 virus in Brazil.

Early life and education 
Góes de Jesus is from Salvador in Northeast Brazil. Her mother is a nursing technician and her father is a civil engineer. She was a teenager when she decided to work in biomedical sciences. Her first research project involved investigations into HIV, which inspired her to pursue a career in global public health. She studied biomedicine at the Escola Bahiana de Medicina e Saúde Pública. Góes de Jesus moved to the Instituto Gonçalo Moniz for her graduate studies, earning a master's degree in biotechnology. Subsequently,  Góes de Jesus completed a doctoral degree at the Federal University of Bahia, specialising in human and experimental pathology. During her doctoral research she visited the University of Birmingham, where she was trained in nanopore sequencing.

Research and career 
After earning her doctoral degree Góes de Jesus joined the University of São Paulo Institute of Tropical Medicine as a São Paulo Research Foundation (FAPESP) research fellow. She started working on the ZIBRA (Zika in Brazil Real Time Analysis) project, which sought to understand the spread of zika virus in Brazil. The ZIBRA project developed two mobile sequencing laboratories, with which they travelled Brazil aiming to sequence 750 genomes.

Góes de Jesus subsequently used the ZIBRA mobile sequencing units to study the epidemiology of a dengue virus outbreak which occurred in Brazil. The majority of infections occurred in São Paulo state, and Góes de Jesus focussed her study on two municipalities: (São José do Rio Preto and Araraquara). A large team of researchers identified that the strain of dengue virus during the 2019 outbreak was most similar to viruses found in Martinique and Guadeloupe. Góes de Jesus is a member of the United Kingdom–Brazil Centre for Arbovirus Discovery, Diagnosis, Genomics and Epidemiology, Diagnosis, Genomics and Epidemiology (CADDE), an epidemics monitoring project that seeks to understand the circulation of arbovirus in Brazil and its persistence in non-epidemic periods.

Alongside her academic work, Góes de Jesus is a science communicator, with a following of over 160,000 people on Instagram.

COVID-19 pandemic 
During the COVID-19 pandemic, Góes de Jesus worked with Ester Cerdeira Sabino to sequence the genome of SARS-CoV-2. After receiving samples from the first infected Brazilian patient on February 26, the team sequenced the genome in 48 hours. Their efforts made it possible to differentiate the version of SARS-CoV-2 that was infecting people in Brazil from the one that first emerged in Wuhan in January 2020.

The team found that the version of SARS-CoV-2 which infected the first Brazilian patient was more akin to the late-January German strain than the original form, whereas the second form was closer to strains from the United Kingdom. In March 2020 the team's success was recognised by Legislative Assembly of Bahia. Pastor Isidório Filho emphasised the importance of their work. On March 6, Maurício de Sousa Produções turned Jesus into a character in the Turma da Mônica series.

References 

1990 births
Living people
Brazilian women academics
Brazilian women scientists
COVID-19 researchers
Academic staff of the University of São Paulo